Sofia Vladimirovna Sotnichevskaya (8 May 1916 — 12 December 2011) is a Soviet and Russian theatre actress.

Sotnichevskaya was born in Petrograd. In 1940, she graduated from Voronezh Teatral College. From 1964 to 2003 she was an actress of the Tula Academic Theatre. In 1962, she was named a Honored Artist of the RSFSR.

Sotnichevskaya died on 12 December 2011, aged 95, in Tula. She was buried in Tula in Smolenskoye Cemetery.

References 

1916 births
Soviet stage actresses
Russian stage actresses
Honored Artists of the RSFSR
2011 deaths
Actresses from Tula, Russia
20th-century Russian women